The Pet Shop Boys are an English synth-pop duo formed in London in 1981. Consisting of primary vocalist Neil Tennant and keyboardist Chris Lowe, they have sold more than 50 million records worldwide, and were listed as the most successful duo in UK music history in the 1999 edition of The Guinness Book of Records.

Three-time Brit Award winners and six-time Grammy nominees, since 1984 they have achieved 42 top 30 singles, 22 of these being top 10 hits on the UK Singles Chart, including four UK number ones: "West End Girls" (also number one on the US Billboard Hot 100), "It's a Sin", a synth-pop version of "Always on My Mind", and "Heart". Other hit songs include a cover of "Go West", and their own "Opportunities (Let's Make Lots of Money)", and "What Have I Done to Deserve This?" in a duet with Dusty Springfield. With five US top ten singles in the 1980s, they are associated with the Second British Invasion.

At the 2009 Brit Awards in London, the Pet Shop Boys received an award for Outstanding Contribution to Music. In 2016, Billboard magazine named the Pet Shop Boys the number one dance duo/group over the 40 years since the chart's inception in 1976. In 2017, the duo received [[List of NME Award winners|NMEs Godlike Genius Award]].

History
Early years (1981–1984)
Neil Tennant and Chris Lowe met in a hi-fi shop on King's Road in Chelsea, London, in 1981. Tennant had purchased a Korg MS-10 synthesizer which sparked a conversation with Lowe. Discovering that they had a mutual interest in disco and electronic music, they became friends. In particular, the pair had a shared love of two electropop records: "Souvenir" by Orchestral Manoeuvres in the Dark (OMD); and "Bedsitter" by Soft Cell, which reflected their lifestyles at the time. According to Tennant, he and Lowe would listen to "pioneers of electronic music", including OMD, Soft Cell, Kraftwerk, the Human League and Depeche Mode.

The duo began to work together on material, first in Tennant's flat in Chelsea, then, from 1982, in a small studio in Camden Town. They say that their band name was taken from friends who worked in a pet shop in Ealing and were known as the "pet shop boys". In August 1983, Tennant, who was an assistant editor at Smash Hits, went to New York to interview Sting. While there, he arranged to meet hi-NRG producer Bobby Orlando and gave him a demo tape containing "It's a Sin" and "Opportunities (Let's Make Lots of Money)".

From 1983 to 1984, Orlando recorded 11 tracks with Tennant and Lowe, including "West End Girls", "Opportunities (Let's Make Lots of Money)", "It's a Sin", "I Want a Lover", "I Get Excited", "Two Divided by Zero", "Rent", "Later Tonight", "Pet Shop Boys", "A Man Could Get Arrested" and "One More Chance". In April 1984, the Orlando-produced "West End Girls" was released, becoming a club hit in Los Angeles and San Francisco. On 2 November, it was voted "Screamer of the Week" by listeners of Long Island, New York, radio station WLIR. It was a minor dance hit in Belgium and France, but was only available in the United Kingdom as a 12" import.

Please (1984–1986)
In March 1985, after long negotiations, the Pet Shop Boys cut their contractual ties with Bobby O, with a settlement giving Bobby O significant royalties for future sales. Hiring manager Tom Watkins, they signed with the London-based Parlophone label. In April, Tennant left Smash Hits magazine – where he had progressed to the position of deputy editor – and in July, a new single, "Opportunities (Let's Make Lots of Money)", was released, reaching number 116 in the UK. The B-side to this single, "In the Night", later resurfaced, in a longer remixed version, as the opening track to the duo's first remix album, Disco, in 1986. This version was also used as the theme for the UK television series The Clothes Show.

They returned to the studio in August to re-record "West End Girls" with producer Stephen Hague. Released in October 1985 it rose slowly in the British charts to become number one in January 1986. It subsequently replicated this success in the United States, Canada, Finland, Hong Kong, Lebanon, Israel, New Zealand and Norway and sold an estimated 1.5 million copies worldwide.

After the success of "West End Girls", the Pet Shop Boys released a follow-up single, "Love Comes Quickly", on 24 February 1986. The single reached number 19 on the UK Singles Chart and was followed by their debut album, Please, on 24 March. In June 1986, the band announced a European tour; however, their plans for a theatrical extravaganza proved to be too expensive and the tour was cancelled. Please started Pet Shop Boys' penchant for choosing one-word album titles, which Neil Tennant has since stated is now a Pet Shop Boys "signature thing", akin to e.e. cummings' use of exclusively lower case letters. New versions of their second single, "Opportunities (Let's Make Lots of Money)", and the album track "Suburbia" were also released in 1986, followed by Disco. In September 1986, Pet Shop Boys performed "Love Comes Quickly" and "West End Girls" at the 1986 MTV Video Music Awards in Los Angeles.

Actually (1987–1988)
1987 started with the Pet Shop Boys receiving both a BRIT Award and Ivor Novello Award for "West End Girls". Later, on 15 June, they released what became their second number one single, "It's a Sin". The single caused some controversy: Tennant's school, St. Cuthbert's Grammar School, in Newcastle upon Tyne, chastised him in the press, while pop impresario Jonathan King accused them of plagiarising the Cat Stevens song "Wild World". King recorded a version of "Wild World" in the style of the Pet Shop Boys to prove his point. The group later sued King and won damages, which were donated to charity. The video to "It's a Sin" also saw their first collaboration with director Derek Jarman.

The continued success of "It's a Sin" was followed by the release of "What Have I Done to Deserve This?" on 10 August. Co-written with Allee Willis and also featuring Dusty Springfield on vocals, the single reached number two on the UK Singles Chart and the U.S. Billboard Hot 100 chart. Although the duo had wanted to release this track on their debut album, they had been unable to track down Springfield and were reluctant to record it with any other female singer, despite their record company's suggestions. Springfield's manager finally contacted them in 1986, following the release of Please, and towards the end of that year, she travelled to London to record "What Have I Done to Deserve This?" with them. It was the first track to be recorded for the duo's second album. Pet Shop Boys had been told that Springfield was difficult to work with and even that she could no longer sing; however, her performance on the track put any such concerns to rest and they began a collaboration with her, which lasted until the end of the decade. Included on their second album Actually, the song became a massive worldwide hit and resurrected Springfield's career, leading to her 1990 album, Reputation, on which Pet Shop Boys were major contributing writers and producers. This duet was also the start of a series of collaborations with high-profile musicians, going on throughout the band's career.

Also in August 1987, Pet Shop Boys appeared on Love Me Tender, a UK television programme, on ITV, commemorating the tenth anniversary of Elvis Presley's death. They were asked to perform one of their favourite Elvis tracks and they narrowed it down to two options, "Baby Let's Play House" and "Always on My Mind", eventually settling on the latter. Their Presley cover would later be re-released in a 12" version, consisting of a medley, along with an acid house track by the duo, titled "In My House". September 1987 saw the release of the duo's second studio album, Actually, followed by the single "Rent" in October, which reached number 8 in the UK. The final song on the album, "King's Cross" accidentally anticipated the King's Cross fire at the London Underground section of the station in November of that year (part of the lyrics read: "Dead and wounded on either side/You know it's only a matter of time"). The Sun newspaper in the UK subsequently tried to get the track released as a charity single, but Pet Shop Boys would not allow this.

Towards the end of 1987, Pet Shop Boys started work on an hour-long film that would incorporate the songs from Please and Actually. Working with director Jack Bond, the short film grew into a full-scale movie, It Couldn't Happen Here, starring Barbara Windsor, Joss Ackland and Gareth Hunt. The film was eventually released in 1988 to mixed reviews. Footage from the film was also used for the music video to "Always on My Mind", now released as a single on 30 November; it became both the duo's third number one single in the UK and the Christmas number one single for 1987, beating "Fairytale of New York" by The Pogues and Kirsty MacColl. In November 2004, The Daily Telegraph newspaper placed Pet Shop Boys' version of "Always on My Mind" at number two in a list of the fifty greatest cover versions of all time.

1988 started with another collaboration. Pet Shop Boys wrote and produced the song "I'm Not Scared" for Patsy Kensit's band, Eighth Wonder. The song became her biggest hit single and the Pet Shop Boys included their own extended version of the track on their Introspective album. March 1988 saw the duo achieve their fourth UK number one single (and their last to date), with a remixed edit of "Heart", different from the album version. This single version would be included on their first and third greatest hits albums, Discography: The Complete Singles Collection and Ultimate, whereas the album version would be used for their second retrospective, the double PopArt: Pet Shop Boys – The Hits. The video to the single, directed by Jack Bond, starred Ian McKellen as a vampire who steals Neil Tennant's wife.

Introspective and Behaviour (1988–1992)

In the 1996 BBC Radio 1 documentary About Pet Shop Boys, Neil Tennant noted that their "Imperial Phase" ended in 1988. On 12 September 1988, Pet Shop Boys released a new single, "Domino Dancing", and in the documentary Neil recounts his disappointment when hearing the news that the single had reached number 7 in the UK Singles Chart. He felt that their major success was now over and that it was going to be a challenge to maintain their level of success in the future.

Unusually, this was a six-track album of previously unheard remixes and new tracks in extended form. It was followed by the Trevor Horn–produced top-five single "Left to My Own Devices", and a cover version of the Sterling Void single "It's Alright", in 1989. 1989 also saw the start of Pet Shop Boys' first tour, in which they performed in Hong Kong, Japan, and Britain. The tour followed the ideas of the extravaganza that could not have been afforded earlier in their careers. Derek Jarman returned to direct the performance and he provided several films that were projected during the shows.

The September 1990 single, "So Hard" reached No.4 in the UK and was followed by their fourth studio album, Behaviour (1990), which was recorded in Munich with producer Harold Faltermeyer. The album was not intended to reflect a dramatic change in mood from their earlier albums; however, it is noticeably subdued. It included the fan favourite "Being Boring", the second single from the album, which only reached No.20 in the UK Singles Chart, their lowest placing at the time. The song was inspired by a quote by Zelda Fitzgerald: "...she refused to be bored chiefly because she wasn't boring", and was widely thought to be a commentary on the AIDS epidemic. The music video was directed by filmmaker Bruce Weber. By this time, the duo had also parted ways with manager Tom Watkins, replacing him with Jill Carrington, who had previously been marketing director at Polydor.

In March 1991, a cover of U2's "Where the Streets Have No Name" as a medley with "Can't Take My Eyes Off You", the 1960s pop song by Frankie Valli/The Four Seasons, was released as a double-A-sided single with a remix of the album track "How Can You Expect to Be Taken Seriously?" by Brothers in Rhythm. This was followed by the duo's first world tour. Named Performance, the tour kicked off in Tokyo, on 11 March 1991. The tour also visited the United States, Canada, France, Belgium, Germany, Denmark, Sweden, Finland, Czechoslovakia, Austria, Hungary, Yugoslavia, Switzerland, Italy, Spain, the Netherlands, Ireland and the United Kingdom. The shows were designed by David Alden and David Fielding, who had designed several sets for the Royal Opera House.

Before taking a break in 1992, in 1991 the Pet Shop Boys released an 18-track compilation called Discography, which included all of their single releases up until then and two new singles—"DJ Culture" and "Was It Worth It?"—omitting only "How Can You Expect to Be Taken Seriously?" (although it did appear on the video companion Videography). While "DJ Culture" had some success, "Was It Worth It?" became the duo's first single to miss the UK Top 20 since their two Bobby O debut singles.

During this period, Pet Shop Boys continued to collaborate with many high-profile musicians. They worked again with Dusty Springfield, on the singles "Nothing Has Been Proved" (which was a song written for their soundtrack for the film Scandal about the Profumo political scandal in Britain) and "In Private". The duo later went on to produce half of the tracks on her 1990 solo Reputation album. Pet Shop Boys were also asked to write and produce an album for Liza Minnelli, in 1989. The album, Results, generated four singles, including the hit single "Losing My Mind", a cover version of the Stephen Sondheim song from the 1971 Broadway musical "Follies". The duo's own demo of this appeared on their "Jealousy" single as a B-side.

Tennant worked with Bernard Sumner and Johnny Marr on their first album as Electronic, whose first single, "Getting Away with It", co-written and co-produced by Tennant, was released on 4 December 1989. In 1991, Lowe also contributed to the Electronic project, contributing the chord sequence to "The Patience of a Saint" on their 1991 album. In 1992, Tennant sang lead vocals on the non-album single "Disappointed", which was featured on the soundtrack to the movie Cool World. Pet Shop Boys set up the Spaghetti Records label in 1991. Their most successful release was the soundtrack to the 1992 film The Crying Game, which featured Boy George performing the title song. The song was produced by Pet Shop Boys and featured Tennant on backing vocals. Other artists on the label included Scottish singer Cicero, The Ignorants, and Masterboy.

In 1992, they were the subjects of a South Bank Show documentary on ITV with contributions from Liza Minnelli, Eric Watson (photographer and video director), Simon Frith (music critic), David Alden and David Fielding.

Very and Disco 2 (1993–1995)

In June 1993, Pet Shop Boys re-invented their image and made a strong return to the UK Singles Chart with "Can You Forgive Her?". Taking its title from the Anthony Trollope novel of the same name, the single reached number 7 on the UK Singles Chart, while its iconic music video featured the duo in orange body suits and tall dunce caps, in a world of computer-generated imagery. The theme was continued with the follow-up single, often considered as their signature song, a cover of the Village People single "Go West", which reached number 2 in the UK, with another computer-generated music video, this time inspired by the Soviet Union, with shots of the duo filmed in Moscow. The tune was adopted into a football chant at Arsenal Football Club (which Chris Lowe supports) and is heard at grounds throughout Europe to this day.

The duo's fifth studio album, Very, followed on 27 September and is the only Pet Shop Boys album to reach number one on the UK Albums Chart. It was produced by Pet Shop Boys and mixed with additional production by Stephen Hague, who had produced their first album and had subsequently produced records by OMD, New Order and Erasure. The other singles from Very, "I Wouldn't Normally Do This Kind of Thing", "Liberation" and "Yesterday, When I Was Mad", continued the theme of CGI videos, peaking with the "Liberation" video, which contained almost no real-life elements at all. All these videos were directed by Howard Greenhalgh, who continued to work with Pet Shop Boys well into the next decade. Very was also released in a limited edition including an entirely new album, Relentless, which was composed of six all-new progressive house tracks, with a darker tone to the perky Very.

In 1994, Pet Shop Boys offered to remix fellow Parlophone act Blur's single "Girls & Boys"; it was a club hit throughout Europe and started a sporadic trend for Pet Shop Boys to remix other artists' music. Also in 1994, Pet Shop Boys released the 1994 Comic Relief single, "Absolutely Fabulous". The song started when Tennant and Lowe were playing around with samples from the BBC sitcom Absolutely Fabulous in the studio. They wanted to release a single, so approached lead actors Jennifer Saunders and Joanna Lumley and suggested releasing it as a charity single. The single was released under the artist name of 'Absolutely Fabulous' too. Tennant and Lowe do not consider it as a Pet Shop Boys single release and it was not included on their next best-of album. The video to the single featured clips from the sitcom, along with newly recorded footage of Tennant and Lowe with the characters of Edina (Saunders) and Patsy (Lumley).

On 12 September 1994, Pet Shop Boys released the follow-up to their 1986 remix album Disco, in the form of Disco 2. The album featured club remixes of the singles released from Very and Behaviour, in a continuous megamix by Danny Rampling. Then, in October, Pet Shop Boys began their Discovery tour, which would see them visit areas that they had never performed in before: Singapore, Australia, Puerto Rico, Mexico, Colombia, Chile, Argentina and Brazil. The following year, a new version of "Paninaro", the 1986 B-side to "Suburbia", was released to promote the B-sides collection Alternative. The single, called "Paninaro '95", is based on the live version from the Discovery tour.

Bilingual and Nightlife (1996–2001)

The Pet Shop Boys remix of the David Bowie song "Hallo Spaceboy" featured Tennant on backing vocals and was released in the UK on 19 February 1996. The Pet Shop Boys then joined Bowie during his performance of the song at the 1996 Brit Awards ceremony, as well as an appearance on the Top of the Pops television program.

In April, Pet Shop Boys released the single "Before" which reached number 7 in the UK Singles Chart. That month, Tina Turner also released her Wildest Dreams album, which featured the Pet Shop Boys-produced track "Confidential". In August, Pet Shop Boys released a follow-up single, "Se a vida é (That's the Way Life Is)", a Latin American music-inspired track, featuring a drum sample from a track called "Estrada da paixão" by Brazilian act Olodum. This preceded the sixth Pet Shop Boys album Bilingual, which was released in September. 

The majority of 1998 was spent with a series of live dates and minor releases, including a charity album of Noël Coward songs, called Twentieth Century Blues. The album included Pet Shop Boys' version of "Sail Away", along with songs performed by Elton John, Texas, Marianne Faithfull, The Divine Comedy, Suede, Damon Albarn, Vic Reeves and Robbie Williams. Tennant also co-produced the Williams track and provided backing vocals for Elton John. Tennant provided backing vocals on Robbie Williams' "No Regrets" single, along with Neil Hannon from The Divine Comedy. Meanwhile, the band switched managers again as Carrington resigned and was succeeded by Mitch Clark, who had previously worked for EMI International as Head of Promotion.

During this time, Pet Shop Boys began to work with playwright Jonathan Harvey on a stage musical project. In 1999, many of the tracks recorded ended up on the duo's seventh studio album, Nightlife, which included the Top 20 singles "I Don't Know What You Want But I Can't Give It Any More" and "New York City Boy", the Top 10 hit "You Only Tell Me You Love Me When You're Drunk", "Closer to Heaven"—which would later become the title of Pet Shop Boys' musical—as well a duet with Kylie Minogue, "In Denial", about a father coming out to his daughter. Minogue later performed the track live, during her 2005 Showgirl tour, singing to a pre-recorded Neil Tennant. This is not the first time that Pet Shop Boys have worked with Minogue: in 1994, they wrote a song for inclusion on her eponymous Kylie Minogue album, called "Falling", which was based on an unreleased remix of "Go West" with new lyrics by Tennant; however, Minogue and her record company did not like the production sound of Pet Shop Boys' demo and asked Farley & Heller to finally produce the track.

Release (2002–2005)

After the mixed fortunes of Closer to Heaven, Pet Shop Boys returned to the studio to start work on their eighth album. After toying with genres including hip hop, they went for a stripped back acoustic sound as a complete change from the over-the-top dance music of the musical. In 2002, they released the modestly successful album Release. Most of the tracks were produced by the duo themselves and many featured Johnny Marr on guitar. The first single, "Home and Dry", featured a very peculiar video, directed by Wolfgang Tillmans, mostly consisting of raw camcorder footage of mice filmed in the London Underground. The follow-up single "I Get Along" had a video filmed by Bruce Weber, and after this they embarked on another world tour, although this time it was a stripped back affair, with no dancers, backing singers, costumes or lavish sets. They used two extra guitarists, Bic Hayes and Mark Refoy, a percussionist (Dawne Adams) and regular programmer (Pete Gleadall) alongside Chris Lowe (keyboards) and Neil Tennant (vocals and guitar).

The tour took them first to several universities around the UK; these dates saw them perform at Bristol University, Keele University, University of East Anglia in Norwich, University of Teesside, Middlesbrough and De Montfort University, Leicester. Subsequent dates took them to Germany, the U.S., Canada, Spain, Italy, France, Belgium, the Netherlands, Denmark, Sweden, then another series of dates in the UK again, Switzerland and onto Japan, Singapore, Hong Kong and then a first-ever date in Thailand as the final show, at the large Bangkok Impact Arena, in front of 9,000 fans. A third single, "London", was only released in Germany, at the request of EMI Germany. It was never planned for release in the UK, although a promotional video was shot by the distinguished photographer Martin Parr and it was serviced to some UK radio stations. Following a live stint on the John Peel show on Radio 1, Pet Shop Boys released Disco 3, in February 2003. The album followed their previous Disco albums, but this one also included new songs as well as remixes.

In 2003, Pet Shop Boys launched two new labels, Olde English Vinyl and Lucky Kunst, their Spaghetti Records label becoming defunct. The first release on Olde English Vinyl was Atomizer's "Hooked on Radiation", followed by Pete Burns' "Jack and Jill Party" in 2004. The only Lucky Kunst release to date is the mentioned Kiki Kokova's version of "Love to Love You Baby". They also remixed Yoko Ono's "Walking on Thin Ice" in 2003 and Rammstein's "Mein Teil" in 2004. Another new manager, David Dorrell, was brought on board to replace Clark. In November 2003, Pet Shop Boys released a second greatest hits album, PopArt: Pet Shop Boys – The Hits, a double compilation with two new singles: "Miracles" and "Flamboyant". Not chronologically arranged, the tracks were divided into two discs: Pop including the more traditional pop songs and Art containing those works which were considered more experimental.

In September 2004, Pet Shop Boys appeared at a free concert in Trafalgar Square in London, where they performed, with the Dresdner Sinfoniker orchestra, a whole new soundtrack to accompany the seminal 1925 silent film Battleship Potemkin. There were four further live performances of the work with the Dresdner Sinfoniker in Germany in September 2005. The Battleship Potemkin soundtrack was then released on 5 September 2005. In November 2004, Pet Shop Boys played at the Prince's Trust concert titled Produced by Trevor Horn with other artists who had worked with the British producer Trevor Horn, including Grace Jones, ABC, Seal and Frankie Goes to Hollywood. In 2005, Pet Shop Boys was selected as the headline act for the Moscow Live 8 concert, in Red Square. They were received extremely well by the crowd in Moscow. Also in 2005, Pet Shop Boys were asked to put together the twentieth release in the Back to Mine series, an ongoing anthology showcasing artists' favourite music selections, with an emphasis on afterhours chill-out music. As a condition, Neil Tennant and Chris Lowe were given one disc each, whereas all previous releases in the series consisted of only a single disc per group (see Back to Mine: Pet Shop Boys).

In July 2017, Pet Shop Boys reissued Release, as part of their 'Catalogue: 1985–2012' series. It features the remastered album, plus bonus tracks, demos and Pet Shop Boys' remixes of their tracks.

Fundamental (2006–2008)

Pet Shop Boys began 2006 remixing Madonna's single "Sorry", for release in February. The single reached number one in the UK and the Pet Shop Boys remix included new backing vocals performed by Tennant. Madonna subsequently used the Pet Shop Boys remix, including Tennant's vocals, on her 2006 Confessions Tour. In April, Pet Shop Boys released a new single that reached No. 8 in the UK, "I'm with Stupid", a commentary on the relationship between George W. Bush and Tony Blair. The promo video featured Matt Lucas and David Walliams, better known as the team behind Little Britain. Lucas and Walliams portray Tennant and Lowe, parodying two of the duo's previous videos, "Go West", and "Can You Forgive Her?". The ninth Pet Shop Boys studio album, Fundamental, followed in May, reaching a strong No. 5 in their home country. The album was produced by Trevor Horn, who Pet Shop Boys had previously worked with on "Left to My Own Devices", in 1988. The album was also released with a limited edition remix album called Fundamentalism, which included a version of "In Private" as a duet with Elton John and "Fugitive", a new track produced by Richard X.

The week that Fundamental was released, a documentary, titled Pet Shop Boys – A Life in Pop, was broadcast on Channel 4, directed by George Scott and produced by Nick de Grunwald. The original broadcast was less than an hour in duration; a 140-minute version was released on DVD in October 2006. Contributors to the programme included Robbie Williams, Brandon Flowers, Tim Rice-Oxley, Jake Shears and Bruce Weber. The DVD also contained promo videos that had been made since the release of PopArt, although the promo for "Flamboyant" only appeared on early pressings of the DVD.

The second single to be taken from the album was the UK top twenty "Minimal". The duo filmed the video to the single in Paris with Dan Cameron. The single was the first of theirs to be playlisted by London's biggest radio station, Capital Radio, in a decade. Pet Shop Boys began a worldwide tour in support of Fundamental in June 2006 in Norway. The show was designed and directed by Es Devlin, the award-winning British theatre designer, and choreographed by Hakeem Onibudo. Between 15 June and 10 September 2006, Pet Shop Boys played a series of concert dates across Europe, mainly at assorted festivals and outdoor venues. These included two dates at the Tower of London on 28 June and 29, and a single show at Thetford Forest. These dates also included performances of Battleship Potemkin, in Germany and Spain. On 1 May 2006, Battleship Potemkin was also performed at the Swan Hunter shipyard, in Newcastle upon Tyne, with Pet Shop Boys accompanied by the Northern Sinfonia orchestra.

On 3 October 2006, the long-delayed U.S. release of their PopArt hits package was issued by Capitol Records. During 2006, Pet Shop Boys worked with Robbie Williams on his then-new album, Rudebox, producing two tracks: a cover version of "We're the Pet Shop Boys", written by My Robot Friend (which they have also recorded themselves and released as a B-side to "Miracles", in 2003) and "She's Madonna", a duet with Tennant, allegedly about Guy Ritchie's affair with Tania Strecker, prior to his relationship with Madonna. On 10 October 2006, Pet Shop Boys embarked on the North and Central American leg of their world tour, which took them through Canada, the United States and Mexico, concluding on 16 November. A DVD of the show in Mexico City was released on 21 May 2007, titled Cubism. It was recorded on 14 November 2006, in the Auditorio Nacional, and was directed by David Barnard.

On 16 October, Catalogue was published by Thames & Hudson, a 336-page hardcover book, written by Philip Hoare and Chris Heath, detailing their entire visual output (photography, as well as the design of albums, videos, concert tours, books and fan club magazines) from 1984 to 2004. Neil Tennant comments in the book: "In the beginning we made a decision – and it was in our EMI contract – that that we would have control over how everything worked; that obviously the songs mattered hugely, but the way they were presented was going to matter hugely as well; and that we were never going to give up on that." Pet Shop Boys supported the publication of the book with signings in London, New York City, Los Angeles and Berlin. To coincide with the publication of Catalogue, a small exhibition of portraits of Pet Shop Boys opened in the Bookshop Gallery of London's National Portrait Gallery, on 30 October 2006 and ran to 28 February 2007.

Also on 16 October, the third single from Fundamental, "Numb", was released, following its appearance at the end of the BBC's coverage of England at the World Cup. It was written by Diane Warren and is the only song on the album not written by Tennant and Lowe. "Numb" became only the second Pet Shop Boys single in their career to miss the Top 20.

On 23 October 2006, Concrete was released. It is a double CD of the complete Mermaid Theatre concert, with the BBC Concert Orchestra (musical director: Trevor Horn), featuring guests Rufus Wainwright, Frances Barber and Robbie Williams. A 90-minute "director's cut" of the concert aired on BBC 6 Music, on 28 August 2006. On 7 December 2006, Pet Shop Boys were nominated for two 2007 Grammy Awards. These were 'Best Dance Recording' for "I'm with Stupid", and 'Best Electronic/Dance Album' for Fundamental.

During the latter part of 2006 and early 2007, Neil Tennant served as executive producer on Rufus Wainwright'salbum, Release the Stars, recorded in Berlin. He sang backing vocals on a number of tracks, including "Do I Disappoint You", and "Tiergarten". They continued their world tour, albeit with a slightly different production and set-list, on 14 March 2007, in Rio de Janeiro, Brazil then played concerts in Argentina, Chile, New Zealand and Australia (as co-headliners of the V Festival 2007), Norway, Estonia, Latvia, Lithuania, Germany, Switzerland, France, the Netherlands, Great Britain, Denmark, Ireland, Sweden, Italy, Spain, Belgium and Singapore. Pet Shop Boys "played" at the free festival Secondfest, in the online virtual world Second Life, on 30 June.

On 8 October 2007, Pet Shop Boys released Disco 4, the latest in their series of remix albums; the fourth in the set differed in that it was largely made up of remixes, completed by Pet Shop Boys, of other artists' work over the past decade. These include The Killers, David Bowie, Yoko Ono, Madonna, Atomizer and Rammstein. Only two tracks by Pet Shop Boys, remixed versions of Fundamental tracks "Integral" and "I'm with Stupid", were included. The Fundamental tour ended in Bucharest, Romania, in November 2007.

In October 2008, Pet Shop Boys released the single "I'm in Love with a German Film Star" featuring famous British photographer Sam Taylor-Wood on vocals. This single was made for her exhibition in London and it was released by Kompakt records in Germany, on both CD and 7" and 12" vinyl. The most notable remixes were by Gui Boratto, Juergen Paape and Mark Reeder, who also made a special mix in 5.1 surround.

In July 2017, Pet Shop Boys reissued Fundamental, as part of their 'Catalogue: 1985–2012' series. It features the remastered album, plus bonus tracks, demos and Pet Shop Boys' remixes of their tracks.

Yes (2009–2011)

Pet Shop Boys completed their next album in late 2008. Recorded with Xenomania and released in UK on 23 March 2009, Yes was a critical success and hit No. 4 in the UK, their highest album chart position in more than a decade. Pet Shop Boys also appeared on Girls Aloud's new album Out of Control, collaborating on the Top-10 track "The Loving Kind", released on 12 January 2009 as a single. Originally written for Yes, The Loving Kind was deemed too bubblegum pop by Lowe and given to the popular girl group to record instead.

On 4 November 2009, Pet Shop Boys celebrated the Brazilian leg of the tour by releasing a compilation titled Party, including songs that were heavily featured in the following TV Globo soap operas: "Being boring" (Meu Bem Meu Mal OST), "Domino dancing" (O Salvador da Patria OST), "West End Girls" (Selva de Pedra OST) and "King of Rome" (Viver a Vida). On 14 December 2009, Pet Shop Boys released an EP of covers, remixes, and new material, titled Christmas. On 20 December the EP entered the UK chart at No. 40.

On 15 February 2010, Pet Shop Boys released a live album/DVD double-pack called Pandemonium. It contains the soundtrack and footage recorded from their 21 December 2009 show at the O2 Arena in London. Pet Shop Boys released their version of "Love life" in April 2010, a song they originally recorded during the Release sessions in 2001 and subsequently gave to Swedish band Alcazar. Released as a limited edition 7-inch dinked vinyl single available only in independent UK record stores, its B-side was "A Powerful Friend", a song originally composed in the early 1980s and subsequently recorded in late 2002 during the recording sessions that would contribute to the Disco 3 album.

In June 2010 Pet Shop Boys headlined the Other Stage on the Saturday evening of the Glastonbury Festival and were heralded as dazzling with "one of the most spectacular Glastonbury moments ever."

They released the November single Ultimate, preceded by the single "Together". In 15 November 2010, they adapted The Most Incredible Thing, a fairy tale by Hans Christian Andersen, opened at Sadlers Wells in London on 17 March 2011. The story has been adapted by Matthew Dunster and features choreography by Javier de Frutos. It features former Royal Ballet star Ivan Putrov, animated films created by Tal Rosner, and orchestrations by German composer Sven Helbig, who worked with the band in 2005 as a co-producer for Battleship Potemkin.

Elysium and Electric (2011–2015)

On 28 September 2011, Pet Shop Boys announced that they had written 16 songs for their next studio album and expected to start recording the new songs in November 2011 for release in Autumn 2012. In the meantime, Format, an album of the duo's B-sides from 1996 to 2009, was released on 6 February 2012 as a sequel to their earlier B-side collection Alternative. Format entered the UK charts at No.26 on 12 February 2012.

On 21 November 2011, the Beyond Theatre Award was presented to Pet Shop Boys and the director of The Most Incredible Thing, Javier de Frutos. The award was introduced and presented by the artist, film director and occasional PSB collaborator Sam Taylor-Wood.

In January 2012, Pet Shop Boys announced on their official website that they had started recording their new album in Los Angeles with producer Andrew Dawson. On 9 June 2012, a film by renowned Los Angeles artist/film-maker Brian Bress for the album track "Invisible" began to circulate on the web and was posted to the official site and the band's YouTube page on 11 June, at which time Elysium was revealed to be name of the new album. That June "Winner" became the first single from the  album Elysium. On 27 June 2012, Pet Shop Boys performed three songs before the Olympic tennis games in Henman Hill, Wimbledon: "Always On My Mind", "What Have I Done to Deserve This?", and "Winner".

The twelfth album, entitled Electric, was released on 12 July 2013. The album was the biggest-selling record among the UK's independent record shops during the week of its release, and went straight to the number 1 position on the Official Record Store Chart. The album was produced by Stuart Price and the release coincides with the Electric World Tour that included Chile, Argentina, Paraguay, Brazil, Colombia, Asia (the duo performed in the Philippines, Indonesia, and China for the first time), Lebanon, Israel, Turkey, Europe and North America.

Super and Hotspot (2016–present)

On 21 January 2016, Pet Shop Boys announced that their thirteenth album, Super, would be released on 1 April. The announcement was accompanied by the release of an album teaser track, "Inner Sanctum". The lead single from the new album, entitled "The Pop Kids", was released on 18 March 2016.  "The Pop Kids" was the duo's eleventh number one on the US Dance Club Songs chart. The album debuted at number three on the UK Albums Chart, selling 16,953 copies in its first week, becoming their 13th consecutive top 10 studio album. In the United States, Super debuted at number 58 on the Billboard 200 with first-week sales of 10,000 copies. It also debuted at number one on Billboard's Dance/Electronic Albums chart, becoming Pet Shop Boys' first number-one album on the chart since Disco 3 (2003).

Pet Shop Boys announced their 'Further Listening' reissues project, called 'Catalogue: 1985–2012' in June 2017. The first batch was released that July with a remaster of 'Nightlife', 'Release' and 'Fundamental'. On 31 August 2017, Pet Shop Boys announced that the reissues for 'Yes' and 'Elysium' would be released on 20 October 2017. Previously released 'Further Listening' albums will also be remastered for 2018, with 'Please', 'Actually' and 'Introspective' reissues being released on 2 March 2018. The fourth and final batch of reissues – 'Behaviour', 'Very' and 'Bilingual' – was released on 31 August 2018.

Pet Shop Boys announced a live album/DVD/Blu-ray release, Inner Sanctum, in April 2019. It followed February's EP Agenda. which contains four new songs with a political and pop culture angle. Neil Tennant said the release "contains three satirical songs and one rather sad song. I think it's because of the times we're living through".

In 2020, their fourteenth album, Hotspot, was released on x2 Records/Kobalt. The corresponding Dreamworld tour was planned to start mid-2020, but was postponed twice due to the COVID-19 pandemic - it finally got underway in May 2022.

In September and October 2022, the band co-headlined the 'Unity Tour' with New Order, playing twelve arenas across Canada and the US.

On 31 December 2022, Pet Shop Boys headlined Edinburgh’s Hogmanay celebrations with a special Dreamworld show. In 2023 they will continue their "Dreamworld" tour, among other headlining the Primavera Sound festivals in Barcelona and Madrid.

In March 2023, the duo announced on their website that they had started working on their fifteenth studio album with producer James Ford. The title and release date are yet to be revealed.

Style and image
In 2020, BBC journalist Nick Levine noted that they still maintain a somewhat "detached and ambivalent approach" to their success, which also shows in their low profile on social media. Music journalist Steve Harnell described them as having both an "ear for commerciality" and the desire to create "something more highbrow". He also described Tennant's lyrics as showing a "love for language", which Tennant sparkles with sometimes quite-obscure cultural references. Their music in the 1980s was inspired by dance music in gay clubs but transformed into a "very British and brainy brand of pop music, shot through with a streak of social comment so subtly done that people frequently missed the point entirely."

Lowe said in a 1986 Entertainment Tonight interview that he doesn't "like country and western. I don't like rock music, I don't like rockabilly or rock and roll particularly. I don't like much, really, do I? But what I do like, I love passionately. The quote was subsequently sampled in the song "Paninaro". The 1997 B-side "How I Learned to Hate Rock and Roll", and their early 1990s songs "DJ Culture", "Can You Forgive Her?" and "How Can You Expect to Be Taken Seriously?" continued this sentiment. They are still known for openly criticising trends in the music business, such as reality television music shows in 2010 ("it's so awful and negative and stifling, and so un-pop").

Their band dynamic has played a role in their public image. Early in their career, the duo were frequently accused of lacking stage presence, said to be a deliberate reaction to the hyper-cheerful music of the time, demonstrated by bands such as Wham!. A typical early performance featured Lowe in the background playing the bassline on a Fairlight synthesiser keyboard and Tennant singing, but otherwise passive, in the foreground. Tennant and Lowe both became well known for standing still throughout performances. In a 2016 interview, Chris Lowe said the duo's live performances were a response to the music scene in the 1980s: "Everyone was so active. It was a big party where everyone was having a great time and smiling at the camera. Thumbs aloft! We just didn't want to do that. So we ignored the cameras and the jollity of the situations. Let's face it, it's easier to stand stock-still isn't it?".

When they first began touring, in 1989, they were heavily influenced by opera and theatre staging. Derek Jarman staged their first tour, making a series of films to be projected behind the costumed singers and dancers. In 1991, they brought in David Alden and David Fielding, from the English National Opera, to create the staging and costume design, for a show which made little attempt to involve or even acknowledge the audience and pushed the choreography and staging centre-stage. Subsequent tours have used artist Sam Taylor-Wood and architect Zaha Hadid for stage design. The Fundamentalism tour in 2006–2007 was conceived and designed by theatre designer Es Devlin, with choreography by Hakeem Onibudo. Es Devlin also conceived the 2009–2010 Pandemonium Tour as well as the Electric Tour beginning in 2013.

Typically, Pet Shop Boys have favoured avant-garde tailored fashions. Tennant has referenced the designers of his suits in certain interviews and Lowe has often sported outfits and glasses made by Issey Miyake, Stüssy and Yohji Yamamoto's Y-3 for Adidas. Presentation has always been a major theme for Pet Shop Boys and the duo have dramatically "re-invented" their image twice in their career. In 1993, when promoting their Very album, they wore brightly-coloured costumes and used state-of-the-art computer technology to place themselves in a modern computer graphic world. This concept of re-invention was revisited for the promotion of their Nightlife album, in which they transformed their look, wearing wigs and glasses, with stylised futuristic urban wardrobes. In 2006, both Tennant and Lowe were seen on stage and in photographs wearing clothes designed by Hedi Slimane/Dior Homme.

They have always been interested in the artwork, design and photography of their own releases. Photographer Eric Watson helped shape the original image of Pet Shop Boys, creating many of their photographs and videos from 1984 to 1991. In design they have primarily worked with Mark Farrow, who designed the cover of their first Parlophone album release in 1986. The collaboration between Mark Farrow and Pet Shop Boys is comparable to the designer/band relationship of Peter Saville and New Order, Anton Corbijn and Depeche Mode, or the epic-length collaboration of Simon Halfon and Paul Weller. Their record sleeves are quite often very minimal and the attention to detail is obvious. In October 2006, British art publisher Thames & Hudson published a 336-page hardcover book titled Pet Shop Boys Catalogue, by Chris Heath and Philip Hoare, showcasing the group's accomplishments in artwork, design and music. A German-language edition was also published. An exhibition of photographs of Pet Shop Boys was organised at the National Portrait Gallery in London to coincide with the publication.

Even the band's fan base has been subject to commentary. In 2001, music theorist Fred Everett Maus wrote that, contrary to the ideologies of anti-commercialism and authenticity embodied by "serious" discussions of popular music such as rock, Pet Shop Boys fans exhibit "an undisguised love of commercial success". This was demonstrated through mailing list discussions from 1998 onwards, in which fans voiced concern over the "most commercially promising selection and marketing of singles" for the then-upcoming Nightlife, and debated the quality of the then-recent Bilingual, spurred by the album's poorer performance in sales. Most posters, Maus summarised, feared that the band's appeal would become essentially limited to a cult following; "dissent, along the lines that the fans would always have the Pet Shop Boys, no matter what happened commercially, was scarce and ineffectual". Noting the fact that Pet Shop Boys "began their career with hits", Maus made the point that this early success was valued by fans: the band's "large audiences" were just as important to "many fans" as the making of "distinctive music that individual fans loved".

The Pet Shop Boys have been noted for keeping their fingers on the musical pulse to date, while "maintaining the mystique of performers from a different era". Lynn Barber, writing for the London Observer on July 1, 1997 stated that "The genius of the Pet Shop Boys was to combine these polar opposites: Neil's wistful introspective lyrics and Chris's mindless, cheerful, upbeat rhythms. They would never have been in the Top 10 without Chris; they would never have engaged an intelligent audience without Neil."

Influence
As of 2003, Pet Shop Boys were ranked by Billboard's Joel Whitburn (in his book Billboard's Hot Dance/Disco 1974–2003) as the fourth most successful act on the U.S. Dance/Club Play charts, behind only Madonna, Michael Jackson and Donna Summer.

The history between Madonna and Pet Shop Boys goes back to 1988, with the song "Heart". In the liner notes to their 1991 greatest hits album, Discography, the band states that: "When we wrote this song ("Heart") we wanted to submit it to Madonna but didn't dare risk disappointment." Pet Shop Boys kept the song for themselves and it ended up going to number one in the UK. Later, in 1991, Madonna was referenced in a tongue-in-cheek lyric, in the song "DJ Culture", soon after she and Sean Penn had divorced. Tennant writes: "Like Liz before Betty / She after Sean / Suddenly you're missing / Then you're reborn". Madonna's album Confessions on a Dance Floor, released November 2005, includes a track called "Jump", which has close similarities to "West End Girls". An interview at Popjustice with Stuart Price, who produced Madonna's album, revealed that the track was a complete Chris Lowe inspiration. Pet Shop Boys then remixed "Sorry", the second single from the album. Madonna has used their version in her 2006 Confessions tour. Lady Gaga stated that she listened regularly to the Pet Shop Boys while working on her debut album The Fame, and that they were an influence on her music.

In October 2005, a Swedish tribute band called West End Girls had a number three hit single in their home country, with a cover version of "Domino Dancing". In January 2006, they released their own version of "West End Girls" and an album was also released in June. In August 2014, the Pet Shop Boys appeared in the BBC Radio 4 series The Archers as last-minute headliners at the fictional festival Loxfest. Both Tennant and Lowe had speaking roles in the show.

Sexuality
Neil Tennant, who neither denied nor confirmed gay rumours throughout the 1980s, "came out" in a 1994 interview for Attitude, a UK gay lifestyle magazine. He has stated that his lyrics are not specifically gay. Many of the duo's songs are written using gender-neutral language, so that they could refer to any gender.

DiscographyStudio albums'''

 Please (1986)
 Actually (1987)
 Introspective (1988)
 Behaviour (1990)
 Very (1993)
 Bilingual (1996)
 Nightlife (1999)
 Release (2002)
 Fundamental (2006)
 Yes (2009)
 Elysium (2012)
 Electric (2013)
 Super (2016)
 Hotspot (2020)

Tours

 MCMLXXXIX Tour (1989)
 Performance Tour (1991)
 Discovery Tour (1994)
 Somewhere Tour (1997)
 Nightlife Tour (1999–2000)
 Uni/Release Tour (2002)
 Fundamental Tour (2006–2007)
 Pandemonium Tour (2009–2010)
 Electric Tour (2013–2015)
 Super Tour (2016–2019)
 Dreamworld Tour (2022)
 Unity Tour with New Order (2022)

 Awards and nominations 
Billboard Music Awards

!Ref.
|-
| rowspan=11|1986
| rowspan=6|Themselves
| Top New Artist
| 
|rowspan=11|
|-
| Top Billboard 200 Artist
| 
|-
| Top Hot 100 Artist
| 
|-
| Top Hot 100 Artist – Duo/Group
| 
|-
| Top Dance Club Play Artist
| 
|-
| Top Dance Sales Artist
| 
|-
| Please| Top Billboard 200 Album
| 
|-
| rowspan=3|"West End Girls"
| Top Hot 100 Song
| 
|-
| Top Dance Sales Single
| 
|-
| rowspan=3|Top Dance Club Play Single
| 
|-
| "Opportunities (Let's Make Lots of Money)"
| 
|-
| rowspan=3|1987
| "It's a Sin"
| 
|rowspan=3|
|-
| rowspan=2|Themselves
| Top Hot 100 Artist
| 
|-
| Top Dance Club Play Artist
| 
|-
| 2007
| "Minimal"
| Top Dance Club Play Single
| 
|

Brit Awards

|-
| style="text-align:left;" rowspan=2|1987
| Themselves 
| Best British Group
|
|-
| "West End Girls"
| Best British Single
|
|-
| style="text-align:left;" rowspan=3|1988
| Themselves 
| Best British Group
|
|-
| "Always on My Mind"
| Best British Single
|
|-
| Actually| rowspan=2|Best British Album
|
|-
| style="text-align:left;" rowspan=2|1989
| Introspective|
|-
| rowspan=2|Themselves 
| rowspan=2|Best British Group
|
|-
| style="text-align:left;"|1992
|
|-
| style="text-align:left;"|1994
| "Go West"
| Best British Video
|
|-
| style="text-align:left;"|2009
| Themselves 
| Outstanding Contribution to Music 
|
|-
| style="text-align:left;"|2010
| "Go West"
| Live Performance of 30 Years
|

Grammy Awards

|-
| style="text-align:left;"|1994
| Very Relentless| Best Recording Package 
|
|-
| style="text-align:left;"|1995
| "Go West"
| Best Music Video, Short Form
|
|-
| style="text-align:left;"|1995
| "Alternative"
| Best Recording Package - Boxed
|
|-
| style="text-align:left;"|1998
| "To Step Aside"
| rowspan="2" | Best Dance Recording
|
|-
| rowspan="2" | 2006
| "I'm with Stupid"
|
|-
| Fundamental| rowspan="2" | Best Dance/Electronic Album
|
|-
| style="text-align:left;"|2010
| Yes|

Ivor Novello Awards

|-
| style="text-align:left;" rowspan=2|1987
| rowspan=2|"West End Girls"
| International Hit of the Year
|
|-
| rowspan=2|Best Contemporary Song
|
|-
| style="text-align:left;" rowspan=2|1988
| "What Have I Done to Deserve This?"
| 
|-
| "It's A Sin"
| International Hit of the Year
|
|-
| style="text-align:left;"|1990
| "Nothing Has Been Proved"
| Best Film Theme or Song
|
|-
| style="text-align:left;"|2000
| Themselves 
| Outstanding Contribution to British Music
|

Lunas del Auditorio

|-
| 2005
| rowspan=3|Themselves
| rowspan=3|Best Foreign Pop Artist 
| 
|-
| 2006
| 
|-
| 2010
| 

Smash Hits Poll Winners Party

|- 
| 1986
| rowspan=4|Themselves 
| rowspan=3|Best Group
| 
|-
| 1987
| 
|-
| rowspan=3|1988
| 
|-
| Worst Group
| 
|-
| "Heart"
| Best Pop Video
| 
|-
| 1990
| Themselves
| Best Group
| 

Other awards
{| class=wikitable
|-
! Year !! Awards !! Work !! Category !! Result
|-
| 1986
| MTV Video Music Awards
| rowspan=3|"West End Girls"
| Best New Artist
| 
|-
| rowspan=4|1987
| American Music Awards
| Favorite Pop/Rock Song
| 
|-
| ASCAP Pop Music Awards
| Most Performed Song
| 
|-
| Bravo Otto Awards
| rowspan=3|Themselves
| Best Rock Band (Silver)
| 
|-
| Silver Clef Award
| Best Newcomer
| 
|-
| rowspan=3|1988
| Berolina Awards
| Group of the Year 
| 
|-
| Houston Film Festival
| "It Couldn't Happen Here"
| Gold July Award
|
|-
| Billboard Music Awards
| rowspan=2|"What Have I Done to Deserve This?"
| Top Dance Club Play Single
| 
|-
| 1989 |
| ASCAP Pop Music Awards
| Most Performed Song
| 
|-
| rowspan=2|1991
| MTV Video Music Awards
| rowspan=2|"Being Boring"
| Viewer's Choice (Europe)
| 
|-
| Music Week Awards
| Music Video of the Year 
| 
|-
| 1992
| Pollstar Concert Industry Awards
| Performance Tour| Most Creative Stage Production
| 
|-
| rowspan=5|1994
| D&AD Awards
| rowspan=2|"Go West"
| Pop Promo Video 
| style="background:#BF8040"| Wood Pencil
|-
| MTV Europe Music Awards
| Best Cover 
| 
|-
| Effects and Nomination Festival
| rowspan=2|"Liberation"
| rowspan=2|Best Music Video
|
|-
| Siggraph Wave Awards
| 
|-
| Billboard Music Awards
| rowspan=2|Themselves
| Top Hot Dance Music Club Play Artist
| 
|-
| rowspan=2|1999
| GAFFA Awards (Denmark)
| Best Foreign Band
| 
|-
| Viva Comet Awards
| "I Don't Know What You Want"
| Best International Video
|
|-
| 2000
| RSH Gold Awards
| Themselves
| Best International Band
| 
|-
| rowspan=2|2003
| GLAAD Media Awards
| Release| Outstanding Music Artist
| 
|-
| World Music Awards
| rowspan=4|Themselves
| The World Arts Award
|
|-
| 2004
| Q Awards
| Inspiration Award
| 
|-
| rowspan=3|2007
| International Dance Music Awards
| Best Dance Artist (Group)
| 
|-
| Webby Awards
| Websites – Celebrity/Fan
| 
|-
| GLAAD Media Awards
| Fundamental| Outstanding Music Artist
|
|-
| 2008
| Cannes International Advertising Festival
| "Integral"
| Gold Cyber Lion Award
|
|-
| 2009
| Popjustice £20 Music Prize
| rowspan=3|"Love Etc."
| Best British Pop Single
| 
|-
| rowspan=3|2010
| rowspan=3|International Dance Music Awards
| Best Pop Dance Track
|
|-
| Best Music Video
|
|-
| rowspan=6|Themselves
| Best Dance Artist (Group)
| 
|-
| 2011
| Evening Standard Theatre Awards
| Beyond Theatre Award
| 
|-
| 2012
| Hungarian Music Awards
| Foreign Electronic Music Production of the Year
| 
|-
| 2013
| Q Awards
| Outstanding Contribution to Music
|
|-
| rowspan=2|2015
| Mnet Asian Music Awards
| Worldwide Inspiration Award
|
|-
| British LGBT Awards
| Best Music Artist
| 
|-
| rowspan=4|2016
| rowspan=2|Gay Music Chart Awards
| "The Pop Kids" 
| Best Lyric Video
| 
|-
| "The Pop Kids" (Offer Nissim Remix)
| Best Music Video from Israel
| 
|-
| Abilu Music Awards
| rowspan=2|Super| International Electronic Album of the Year
| 
|-
| AMFT Awards
| Best Dance/Electro Album
| 
|-
| rowspan=2|2017
| NME Awards
| Themselves
| Godlike Genius Award
|
|-
| San Diego Film Awards
| "Twenty-Something"
| Best Music Video
| 
|-
| 2019
| rowspan=2|Classic Pop Reader Awards
| Further Listening 1984–1986| Reissue of the Year
| 
|-
| 2020
| rowspan=2|Themselves
| Group of the Year
| 
|-
|rowspan=2|2021
| rowspan=2|GAFFA Awards
| Best International Band
| 
|-
| Hotspot''
| Best International Album
|

References

External links 

 Official website
 
 
 Pet Shop Boys dedicated page at Eurochannel
 Czech website

 
Brit Award winners
NME Awards winners
English synth-pop groups
English pop music duos
English electronic music duos
British disco groups
English house music duos
Dance-pop groups
Male musical duos
LGBT-themed musical groups
Art pop musicians
Musical groups established in 1981
Parlophone artists
Atlantic Records artists
Capitol Records artists
Astralwerks artists
EMI Records artists
Remixers
Ivor Novello Award winners
Musical groups from London
1981 establishments in England
King's Road, Chelsea, London
Second British Invasion artists